Platynochaetus is a genus of hoverflies. A diagnostic feature of the genus is the peculiar shape of the male antennae.

Species
P. macquarti Loew, 1862
P. rufus Macquart, 1835
P. setosus (Fabricius, 1794)

References

External links
 Blog de Mario – Until every cage is empty ( http://mdm84.wordpress.com/2009/03/28/platynochaetus-setosus/ ) for excellent photos.

Diptera of Europe
Hoverfly genera
Taxa named by Christian Rudolph Wilhelm Wiedemann